Marco Ruitenbeek (born 12 May 1968) is a Dutch former professional footballer who played as a goalkeeper for Dutch side AZ and Scottish club Dunfermline Athletic, as well as Go Ahead Eagles and SV Huizen.

Career
Ruitenbeek was born in Weesp, North Holland. He started his career with AZ, making appearances in both the Eredivisie and Eerste Divisie, before moving to Go Ahead Eagles in 1997. He spent three years with the club before moving to Scotland and signing for Scottish Premier League side Dunfermline Athletic in June 2000. He made his debut in a 3–0 friendly defeat against Dundee in August 2000. Ruitenbeek played in the majority of matches in his first two seasons with the club, however he lost his place after Dunfermline signed Wigan Athletic goalkeeper Derek Stillie, making only 20 appearances in the second half of his career with the Pars. His final match with the side came in a one-all draw with Dundee United. Ruitenbeek played over 90 games for the Pars been 2000 and 2004. After he left Scotland, he moved back to the Netherlands to play for Hoofdklasse side SV Huizen, playing with the amateur side for one season, before hanging up his gloves in May 2005.

Career statistics

References

External links

Dutch Players Abroad

1968 births
Living people
People from Weesp
Dutch footballers
Footballers from North Holland
Association football goalkeepers
Eredivisie players
Eerste Divisie players
Scottish Premier League players
AZ Alkmaar players
Go Ahead Eagles players
Dunfermline Athletic F.C. players
SV Huizen players
Dutch expatriate footballers
Dutch expatriate sportspeople in Scotland
Expatriate footballers in Scotland